A cotton rat is any member of the rodent genus Sigmodon. Their name derives from their damaging effects on cotton as well as other plantation crops, such as sugarcane, corn, peanut and rice.  Cotton rats have small ears and dark coats, and are found in North and South America. Members of this genus are distributed in the Southwestern United States, Mexico, Central America, and South American countries of: Venezuela, Ecuador, Colombia, Peru, Brazil, Guyana, and Suriname. Many of the species are found in Mexico.

They are primarily herbivores. The molars of cotton rats are S-shaped when viewed from above. The genus name literally means S-tooth.

Sigmodon hispidus was the first model organism to be used in polio research.

Classification
Genus Sigmodon
Subgenus Sigmodon
Sigmodon hispidus species group
Sigmodon alleni - Allen's cotton rat
Sigmodon arizonae - Arizona cotton rat
Sigmodon hirsutus - Southern cotton rat
Sigmodon hispidus - Hispid cotton rat
Sigmodon mascotensis - Jaliscan cotton rat
Sigmodon ochrognathus - Yellow-nosed cotton rat
Sigmodon planifrons - Miahuatlán cotton rat
Sigmodon toltecus - Toltec cotton rat
Sigmodon zanjonensis - montane cotton rat
Sigmodon fulviventer species group
Sigmodon fulviventer - tawny-bellied cotton rat
Sigmodon inopinatus - unexpected cotton rat
Sigmodon leucotis - white-eared cotton rat
Sigmodon peruanus - Peruvian cotton rat
Subgenus Sigmomys
Sigmodon alstoni - Alston's cotton rat

References

External links
Tree of Life: cotton rats

 
Sigmodontinae
Rat, Cotton
Taxa named by George Ord